Perica is a Croat and Serb given name, used mostly for men but also for women. It is also prevalent as a surname. Perica is a diminutive of Petar, translating to Pete and Peter in English, respectively.

In Croatian and Serbian popular culture Perica often portrays a stereotype of an innocent or mischievous young boy with a very straightforward way of thinking. An example is Perica Šafranek in the 1970 classic Croatian (then Yugoslav) comedy film Tko pjeva zlo ne misli. He is common in jokes and is similar to Little Johnny in English.

Given name
 Perica Bukić, Croatian water polo player and politician
 Perica Ivetić, Bosnian footballer
 Perica Marošević, American Major League Soccer player
 Perica Ognjenović, Serbian soccer player
 Perica Radić, Serbian soccer player
 Perica Stančeski, Macedonian soccer player
 Perica Vlašić, Croatian rower
 Perica Vukičević, handball player

Surname
Kristina Perica, Croatian sprinter
Petar Perica, Croatian Catholic priest
Rose Perica Mofford (maiden name of Perica that was kept as middle name), Governor of Arizona from 1988 to 1991
Stipe Perica, Croatian professional footballer
Vjekoslav Perica, Croatian writer and academic
Zlatko Perica, guitarist 
Filip Perica, Croatian rugby player

See also
 Pero (name)
 Ivica

References

Surnames
Croatian feminine given names
Croatian masculine given names
Serbian feminine given names
Serbian masculine given names
Croatian surnames